Venado Tuerto (Spanish for One Eyed Deer) is a city in the south-west of the , 322 km from the provincial capital. It has about 76,000 inhabitants.

History 
Venado Tuerto was founded on April 26, 1884 by Eduardo Casey, born in Lobos, Buenos Aires, in 1847. He was the son of two Irish immigrants who had amassed considerable wealth. Casey bought a large extension of land from where the natives had been recently expelled, to be employed for farming and horse breeding.

The name of the town literally means one-eyed deer, and its origin is unknown, though several folk legends circulate around it. In any case, it was not considered tasteful by some, and on several occasions a change was formally requested, mainly to 'Ciudad Casey' ('Casey City'), though never carried out.

The town was declared a city on December 16, 1935. As of 2008 its mayor is José Luis Freyre, of the Justicialist Party.

Venadense
Norma Beatriz Nolan (born 1938) Miss Universe 1962
Leo Genovese (born 1979) Jazz musician
Chris de Burgh (born 1948), musician, was born here
Pablo Giralt (born 1974), sports anchor
Federico Lussenhoff (born 1974), ex-footballer
Guillermo Coria (born 1982), professional tennis player

External links

 
In Spanish unless otherwise noted.
 Municipalidad de Venado Tuerto (official website)
 Concejo Municipal de Venado Tuerto (official website)
 
 

Populated places in Santa Fe Province
Populated places established in 1884
Cities in Argentina
Argentina
Santa Fe Province